Carolyn Brown (born September 26, 1927) is an American dancer, choreographer, and writer. She is best known for her work as a founding member of the Merce Cunningham Dance Company.

Biography 
Coming from a dancing family in Fitchburg, Massachusetts, Carolyn (Rice) Brown studied with her mother, Marion Rice in Fitchburg. Brown was a product of the Denishawn School and graduated in philosophy from Wheaton College in 1950.

After attending a masterclass with Cunningham in Denver in 1951, she decided to pursue dance full-time and moved to New York to continue her studies at the Juilliard School. She also studied with Cunningham and became one of the founding members of his company, which was born at Black Mountain College in North Carolina in the summer of 1953. She was the most important female dancer in Cunningham's company for the next twenty years and danced in 40 of his works, often collaborating with Cunningham and John Cage in the creative process. She created a role in Cage's Theatre Piece (1960) and on pointe in Robert Rauschenberg's first dance work Pelican (1963). A dancer of great purity and virtuosity, she was considered the ideal Cunningham interpreter.

In the early days of the company, she was married to composer Earle Brown. Later, she formed a long partnership with photographer James Klosty.

Her own choreography includes Car Lot (1968), As I Remember It, a solo in homage to Shawn (Jacob's Pillow, 1972), Bunkered for a Bogey (1973), House Party (1974), Circles (1975), and Balloon II (Ballet-Théâtre Contemporain, 1976).

Upon retirement in 1973 she took up teaching. She also continues to work with the Cunningham company as an artistic consultant. She is a member of the Cunningham Dance Foundation Board of Directors, and has worked as a freelance choreographer, filmmaker, writer, lecturer, and teacher. She has been awarded the Dance Magazine Award, five National Endowment for the Arts grants, and a John Simon Guggenheim Fellowship. Her writing has been published in The New York Times, Dance Perspectives, Ballet Review, and the Dance Research Journal. She lives in Millbrook, New York.

Memoir 
In 2007, Brown published her memoir Chance and Circumstance: Twenty Years with Cage and Cunningham, which tells the story of her career, of the formative years of the Merce Cunningham Dance Company, and of the two artists at its center — Merce Cunningham and John Cage.

References

External links
Archive film of Carolyn Brown performing Banjo in 1955 at Jacob's Pillow

1927 births
Living people
American choreographers
Wheaton College (Massachusetts) alumni